Synthesis & Other Virtual Realities is a collection of science fiction stories by American writer Mary Rosenblum.  It was released in 1996 and was the author's first collection of stories.  It was published by Arkham House in an edition of 3,515 copies.  The stories originally appeared in Isaac Asimov's Science Fiction Magazine.

Contents

Synthesis & Other Virtual Realities contains the following stories:

 "Water Bringer"
 "Entrada"
 "The Centaur Garden"
 "Second Chance"
 "Bordertown"
 "Synthesis"
 "Flood Tide"
 "The Rain Stone"
 "Stairway"

References

External links 
 

1996 short story collections
Science fiction short story collections
Works originally published in Asimov's Science Fiction
Arkham House books